Florian Kastenmeier (born 28 June 1997) is a German professional footballer who plays as a goalkeeper for Fortuna Düsseldorf in the .

Career
Kastenmeier made his professional debut with Fortuna Düsseldorf in a 2–1 DFB-Pokal win over Erzgebirge Aue on 30 October 2019.

References

External links
 
 
 Bundesliga Profile

1997 births
Living people
Sportspeople from Regensburg
German footballers
Germany youth international footballers
Association football goalkeepers
Fortuna Düsseldorf players
VfB Stuttgart II players
FC Augsburg II players
Bundesliga players
Regionalliga players
Footballers from Bavaria